Dieter Härtwig (born 18 July 1934 in Dresden) is a German dramaturge, musicologist and author of numerous writings on Dresden's music history and its personalities.

After gaining his Abitur from Kreuzschule, Härtwig studied musicology and German literature at the University of Leipzig. He was awarded a doctorate in 1963 with a dissertation on Rudolf Wagner-Régeny.

From 1965 to 1997 he was chief dramaturg of the Dresden Philharmonic, and for many years he was also deputy artistic director.

The honorary professor at the Institute for Musicology of the Hochschule für Musik Carl Maria von Weber has written numerous articles and contributions, for example on the Dresden Philharmonic and the Dresdner Kreuzchor; he has also written numerous biographies of artists.

Publications 
 Die Dresdner Philharmonie. Altis, Leipzig 1992, .
 as editor: 125 Jahre Dresdner Philharmonie 1870–1995. DZA Verlag, 1995, .
 together with Matthias Herrmann: Der Dresdner Kreuzchor – Geschichte und Gegenwart, Wirkungsstätten und Schule. Evangelische Verlagsanstalt, Leipzig 2006, .

References

External links 
 

Dramaturges
German musicologists
1934 births
Living people
Academic staff of the Hochschule für Musik Carl Maria von Weber